Jonny Jakobsen (born 17 November 1963) is a Dano-Swedish former Bubblegum dance/eurodance singer better known under his fictitious identity as Indian taxi driver Dr. Bombay.  He began as a country singer called Johnny Moonshine, but became famous only after developing the persona of Dr. Bombay.  His debut was in 1998 with the album Rice and Curry, hitting the charts with the title track "Rice & Curry", as well as "Calcutta (Taxi Taxi Taxi)" and "SOS (The Tiger Took My Family)". Subsequently, he went on to record albums as faux-Scottish Dr. MacDoo and faux-Mexican Carlito. Even though he grew up in Sweden, his citizenship is Danish. He speaks both Danish and Swedish.

He has gained some fame and notoriety in the Europop scene. Two of his songs have appeared in the Beatmania IIDX series of video games, one of them appeared in Samba de Amigo and another one in Pump It Up PRO 2.

Before "Dr. Bombay"
Jonny Jakobsen was born in Sweden on 17 November 1963 to Danish father Ejner Jakobsen and a Swedish mother who died in 1992/3. His twin sister Susanne and him are the youngest of five children. He has two older sisters Vinni and Lis and an older brother Niels. He has a son called Jimmy Jakobsen born in 1983/4.

Before his music career, he was a taxi driver in Copenhagen.

He began his career as a faux-country/pop singer called Johnny Moonshine. As Johnny Moonshine, Jakobsen released one album titled Johnny Moonshine & The Troubled Water Band (1995).

Due to the failure of Johnny Moonshine, Jakobsen moved on in search of a newer, more 'annoying' sound. He chose the style of eurodance, which was just becoming popular in the mid 1990s, and began his career as the fake Indian "Dr. Bombay", facing controversy along the way. Jakobsen teamed up with Robert Uhlmann, who is famous for his work with Smile.dk

Johnny Moonshine

Albums

Dr. Bombay

Jakobsen's earliest career success was prompted by the introduction of the Dr. Bombay character in 1998. In his lyrics, the character is portrayed as an Indian taxi driver, mystic, sitar player, chef, snake charmer and avid fan of elephant racing. He appears clad in traditional Indian garb, such as a kurta and pagri, with the addition of dark glasses that are also worn by the other characters portrayed by Jakobsen.

In 2018 Dr. Bombay celebrated his 20th anniversary with a new single entitled "Stockholm to Bombay". a year later on 5 October 2019 he published a music video for the song "Stockholm to Bombay".

Singles

Albums

Dr. MacDoo

Singles

Albums

Carlito

Singles

Albums

References

External links 

 Dr. Bombay at Bubblegum Dancer

1963 births
Living people
Video game musicians
Eurodance musicians
English-language singers from Sweden
Swedish dance musicians
Swedish people of Danish descent
20th-century Swedish musicians
21st-century Swedish musicians